The 98th Guards Airborne Division is an airborne division of the Russian Airborne Troops, currently based in Ivanovo.

History

Second World War
During the Second World War, the formation began its existence as the 98th Guards Rifle Division (:ru:98-я гвардейская стрелковая дивизия). It incorporated 296th Guards Rifle Regiment (formerly the 18th Independent Guards Airborne Brigade), 299th GRR (fmr 19 IGAB), 302nd GRR (fmr 20 IGAB). Formed in December 1943-January 1944 at Demitrov in the Moscow Military District. It was part of the 37th Guards Airborne Corps, 9th Guards Army on the Karelian Front (May 1944), on the Svir river (June 1944) and near Budapest in February 1945. The division ended the war near Prague.

Cold war
On 7 June 1946, the division became an airborne unit at Pokrovka, Primorsky Krai. It included the 296th Guards Air-Landing Regiment, the 299th Guards Airborne Regiment and the 17th Guards Artillery Regiment. On 1 October 1948, the 296th was used to form the 13th Guards Airborne Division and was replaced by the new 95th Guards Air-Landing Regiment. In 1949, the 95th became an airborne regiment.

On 1 June 1951, the division relocated to Belogorsk. The 217th Guards Airborne Regiment joined the 98th from the disbanded 13th Guards Airborne Division on 30 April 1955. In April 1956, the 95th was disbanded and replaced by the disbanded 99th Guards Airborne Division's 300th Guards Airborne Regiment. The 17th Guards Artillery Regiment also disbanded and was replaced by the 74th Guards Artillery Regiment of the 99th Division.

In June 1956, the 37th Guards Airborne Corps was disbanded and the division was directly subordinated to the Airborne Headquarters. On 6 January 1959, the 243rd Separate Military-Transport Aviation Squadron was activated with the division, equipped with 10 Antonov An-2 transports. On 15 August 1960, the 74th Guards Artillery Regiment became the 812th Separate Guards Artillery Battalion. The battalion became the 1065th Guards Artillery Regiment on 27 April 1962.

On 22 February 1968, for achievements in combat and political training, and in connection with the 50th anniversary of the USSR Armed Forces, the Division was awarded the Order of Kutuzov, 2nd degree. In August 1969, units of the division relocated to Bolgrad in the Odessa Military District (division headquarters, 217th and 299th Guards Airborne Regiments, part of the services) and Chisinau (300th Guards Airborne Regiment) and Merry Kut, Artsyz Raion (1065th Guards Artillery regiment).

The division became involved in the major exercises "South", "Spring 72 ", " 73 - Crimea ", " Ether -74 ", "Spring -75 ", " Shield -79 ", " Shield -82 "" Summer 90 ".

End of Soviet
In summer 1991, the division received instructions from the Government of Ukraine to swear allegiance to the Ukrainian Armed Forces. The division staff and most of the troops refused the order; the division had a large number of ethnic Ukrainians but loyalty to the division and the VDV took precedence over ethnic roots.On 1 October 1992, the 300th Guards Airborne Regiment left the division and became a separate unit. It was replaced by the 106th Guards Airborne Division's 331st Guards Airborne Regiment.

The division was relocated from Bolgrad in Ukraine to Ivanovo after the fall of the Soviet Union during early 1993, following an agreement between Russia and Ukraine over dividing the division's equipment. A significant number of ethnic Ukrainian paratroopers (around 40% of the division's manpower) transferred to the Ukrainian military and formed the 1st Airmobile Division. The rest of the formation moved to Ivanovo in the spring of 1993 and by April the division was transferred to the Russian military. 

In October 1992, the 300th Guards Parachute Regiment was detached and sent to Abakan in the Siberian Military District. In the city of Abakan, four years later, the 300th Guards Parachute Regiment was reorganised as the 100th independent Guards Airborne Brigade, but was then disbanded circa 1998.

In December 1997, the 299th Guards Airborne Regiment was absorbed into the 217th Guards Airborne Regiment.

Present
Today, its two regiments, the 217th and 299th, are stationed near the Ivanovo Severny military-transport airfield. However another source lists the two constituent regiments as the 217th and 331st, the later having  transferred from 106th 'Tula' Guards Airborne Division in 1998.

It took part in the 2008 Russo-Georgian War in the Battle of Tskhinvali of the South Ossetian theatre.

War in Ukraine
In August 2014, 10 members of the division were captured, amidst the War in Donbass, near the Russia–Ukraine border; according to Ukraine while conducting operations in Ukraine, after having crossed the border illegally; according to Russia they had "crossed the border by accident on an unmarked section". Russia has been accused of, and has denied, supporting the pro-Russian separatists who battled the Ukrainian army in the War in Donbass. A battalion tactical group of the division's 331st Guards Regiment allegedly participated in the August fighting. In February 2015, its 217th Guards Regiment and 1065th Guards Artillery Regiment were allegedly participating in the war.

In January 2022, elements of the division's 217th Airborne Regiment were reportedly deployed to Belarus in the context of the Ukraine crisis.

During the 2022 Russian invasion of Ukraine, the division participated in the Kyiv offensive. One of its regiments, the 331st Guards Airborne Regiment, suffered heavy losses; its commander, Colonel Sergei Sukharev was allegedly killed in action. The division's commander Colonel Viktor Gunaza was dismissed by end of March.

Units as of 2014 

98th Division HQ - (Ivanovo)
15th Maintenance Battalion (Ivanovo)
36th Medical Detachment (airmobile) (Ivanovo)
215th Reconnaissance Battalion (Ivanovo)
674th Guards Signal Battalion (Ivanovo)
661st Engineer Battalion (Ivanovo)
728th Courier-Postal station (Ivanovo)
969th Airborne Support Company (Ivanovo)
1683rd Logistics Battalion (Ivanovo)
Training Center (Pesochnoe village, Yaroslavl region)
217th Guards Airborne Regiment (Ivanovo)
331st Guards Airborne Regiment  (Kostroma)
1065th Guards Artillery Red Banner Regiment (Kostroma)
5th Guards Anti-Aircraft Missile Regiment (Ivanovo)
243rd Military Transport Aviation Squadron in Ivanovo

At some point, it was planned that the 137th Guards Airborne Regiment in Ryazan would join from the 106th Guards Airborne Division, which was to disband. However the disbandment of the 106th Guards has now been rescinded.

Commanders 

 Vitali Mikhailovich Lebedev 1977—1982
 Osvaldas Mikolovich Pikauskas 1982—1985
 Aleksandr Alekseevich Chindarov 1985—1989
 Valeri Aleksandrovich Vostrotin 1989—1992
 Aleksandr Nikolaevich Bespalov 1992—1996
 Aleksandr Ivanovich Lentsov 1996—2009
 Aleksei Nikolaevich Ragozin 2010—2013
 Sergei Nikolaevich Volyk 2013—2015
 Dmitri Aleksandrovich Ulyanov 2015—2017
 Nikolai Petrovich Choban 2017—2020
 Viktor Igorevich Gunaza 2020—2022

References

Airborne divisions of Russia
098
Military units and formations awarded the Order of the Red Banner
Military units and formations of the Soviet Union in the Winter War
Military units and formations of Russia in the war in Donbas